Phyllonorycter orientalis is a moth of the family Gracillariidae. It is known from the islands of Hokkaido and Kyushu in Japan and from the Russian Far East and Taiwan.

The wingspan is 5.5–6 mm.

The larvae feed as leaf miners on Acer species, including Acer mono, Acer palmatum and Acer carpinifolium. The mine is situated on the lower surface of the leaf.

References

orientalis
Moths of Asia

Moths of Japan
Moths of Taiwan
Moths described in 1963
Taxa named by Tosio Kumata
Leaf miners